Women's World Tag Team Championship refer to a Professional wrestling championship for tag teams consisting of two female wrestlers. Several wrestling companies have promoted a world women's tag team championship including:

See also
:Category:Women's professional wrestling tag team championships